Nick Forshager is an American sound editor. He has been nominated for ten Primetime Emmy Awards in the category Outstanding Sound Editing. Forshager also won a Primetime Emmy Award in the category Outstanding Sound Editing for a Limited or Anthology Series, Movie or Special for the crime drama television series Fargo in 2016.

References

External links 

Living people
Place of birth missing (living people)
Year of birth missing (living people)
American sound editors
Primetime Emmy Award winners